Gonioterma is a genus of moths in the subfamily Stenomatinae.

Species
Gonioterma advocata (Meyrick, 1916)
Gonioterma algosa (Meyrick, 1916)
Gonioterma aesiocopia (Walsingham, 1913)
Gonioterma alsiosum Walsingham, 1913
Gonioterma anna Busck, 1911
Gonioterma argicerauna (Meyrick, 1925)
Gonioterma bolistis (Meyrick, 1925)
Gonioterma bryophanes (Meyrick, 1915)
Gonioterma burmanniana (Stoll, [1782])
Gonioterma chlorina (Kearfott, 1911)
Gonioterma choleroptila (Meyrick, 1915)
Gonioterma chromolitha (Meyrick, 1925)
Gonioterma compressa (Walsingham, 1913)
Gonioterma conchita Busck, 1920
Gonioterma crocoptila (Meyrick, 1915)
Gonioterma crambitella (Walsingham, 1889)
Gonioterma descitum Walsingham, 1913
Gonioterma diatriba (Walsingham, 1913)
Gonioterma dimetropis (Meyrick, 1932)
Gonioterma expansa (Meyrick, 1915)
Gonioterma exquisita Duckworth, 1964
Gonioterma fastigata (Meyrick, 1915)
Gonioterma gubernata (Meyrick, 1915)
Gonioterma ignobilis (Zeller, 1854)
Gonioterma indecora (Zeller, 1854)
Gonioterma inga Busck, 1911
Gonioterma latipennis (Zeller, 1877)
Gonioterma linteata (Meyrick, 1916)
Gonioterma mistrella (Busck, 1907)
Gonioterma notifera (Meyrick, 1915)
Gonioterma pacatum Walsingham, 1913
Gonioterma periscelta (Meyrick, 1915)
Gonioterma phortax Meyrick, 1915
Gonioterma pleonastes (Meyrick, 1915)
Gonioterma projecta (Meyrick, 1915)
Gonioterma seppiana (Stoll, [1781])

References

 
Stenomatinae
Taxa named by Thomas de Grey, 6th Baron Walsingham
Moth genera